Aspergillus israelensis is a species of fungus in the genus Aspergillus. It is from the Nidulantes section. The species was first described in 2016. It has been isolated from the Dead Sea in Israel.

References 

israelensis
Fungi described in 1978